R. Venkataramani (born 13 April 1950) is an Indian constitutional lawyer and a Senior Advocate in the Supreme Court of India. He is currently serving as the Attorney-General for India. He was appointed as a Member, Law Commission of India in 2010. He has been appearing for the State of Tamil Nadu as a Special Senior Counsel for the past 12 years and also acting as Special Senior Counsel for the State of Andhra Pradesh. His alma mater is Loyola College, Chennai. He did his schooling in Petit Seminaire Higher Secondary School - Puducherry.

References 

1950 births
Living people
Attorneys General of India